Punta Chungo Airport ,  is an airport serving Los Vilos, a Pacific coastal town in the Coquimbo Region of Chile.

There is distant rising terrain north and east.

See also

Transport in Chile
List of airports in Chile

References

External links
OpenStreetMap - Punta Chungo
OurAirports - Punta Chungo
FallingRain - Punta Chungo Airport

Airports in Chile
Airports in Coquimbo Region